Jørn Terndrup (born 3 December 1947) is a Danish politician. He is a member of the party Venstre, and was the first mayor of the Nyborg Municipality, created during the 2007 municipal reform, by merging Nyborg Municipality, Ullerslev Municipality and Ørbæk Municipality.

References 

1947 births
Living people
Danish municipal councillors
Mayors of places in Denmark
People from Nyborg
Venstre (Denmark) politicians